John McEnroe was the defending champion and won in the final 6–1, 6–4, 7–5 against Henri Leconte.

Seeds

  John McEnroe (champion)
  Ivan Lendl (quarterfinals)
  Kevin Curren (second round)
  Steve Denton (first round)
  Henri Leconte (final)
  Chris Lewis (first round)
  Mark Edmondson (second round)
  Pat Cash (first round)

Draw

Finals

Section 1

Section 2

External links
 1983 Custom Credit Australian Indoor Championships draw

Singles